Henrique Gelain Custodio (born 5 January 1995), simply known as Henrique, is a Brazilian professional footballer who plays as a left back for Liga Portugal 2 club B-SAD.

Club career
Born in Carazinho, Rio Grande do Sul, Henrique graduated from Coritiba's youth setup. On 26 May 2015, he was promoted to the main squad after spending a year with the under-23s.

On 4 June 2015, Henrique made his Série A debut, starting in a 0–2 away loss against Fluminense.

References

External links

1995 births
Sportspeople from Rio Grande do Sul
Living people
Brazilian footballers
Association football defenders
Coritiba Foot Ball Club players
Clube Náutico Capibaribe players
Paraná Clube players
Portimonense S.C. players
S.C. Farense players
Belenenses SAD players
Campeonato Brasileiro Série A players
Campeonato Brasileiro Série B players
Campeonato Paranaense players
Campeonato Pernambucano players
Primeira Liga players
Liga Portugal 2 players
Brazilian expatriate footballers
Expatriate footballers in Portugal
Brazilian expatriate sportspeople in Portugal